The Starmen is a science fiction novel by American writer Leigh Brackett. It was published in 1952 by Gnome Press in an edition of 5,000 copies.  It was also published by Ballantine Books in 1976 under the original magazine title of The Starmen of Llyrdis.  Ace Books published an abridged edition under the title The Galactic Breed.  The Ace edition was published as an Ace Double with Conquest of the Space Sea by Robert Moore Williams.  The novel was originally serialized in the magazine Startling Stories in 1951.

Plot introduction
The novel is a space opera concerning the only race that is able to endure the rigors of interstellar travel.

Reception
Contemporary reviews were lukewarm to mildly positive.  In F&SF, Anthony Boucher and J. Francis McComas  described The Starmen as "an able job of writing a completely routine and uncreative space opera."  In Galaxy Magazine, Groff Conklin called the novel "a pleasurable way to pass a couple of hours" and noted that Brackett "writes well, moves her plot along at a suitable pace, and maneuvers her characters in a lifelike manner."

References

Sources

1952 American novels
1952 science fiction novels
Fiction set around Aldebaran
Novels by Leigh Brackett
Novels first published in serial form
Space opera novels
Works originally published in Startling Stories
Gnome Press books